Damascus bombing may refer to:

 1981 Damascus bombing
 1986 Damascus bombings
 2008 Damascus car bombing
 2011 Damascus bombings
 March 2012 Damascus bombings
 10 May 2012 Damascus bombings
 18 July 2012 Damascus bombing
 2016 Damascus bombings
 March 2017 Damascus bombings
 2018 Damascus Bombing
 2021 Damascus bus bombing

Set index articles